Francis Ishida Benjamin (born 20 June 1993) is a Nigerian footballer who plays for Speranța Nisporeni as a left-back.

International career
Benjamin had his debut in 2010 and has been a regular since a friendly match against Niger on 15 August 2012. He was selected for Nigeria's squad at the 2013 FIFA Confederations Cup and played in 2014 world cup qualifiers.

References 

http://www.soccerbase.com/players/player.sd?player_id=70295

1993 births
Living people
Nigerian footballers
Association football defenders
Hapoel Tel Aviv F.C. players
2013 FIFA Confederations Cup players
Israeli Premier League players
Place of birth missing (living people)
Nigeria international footballers
Nigeria A' international footballers
2014 African Nations Championship players
Nigerian expatriate sportspeople in Israel
Nigerian expatriate sportspeople in Moldova
Speranța Nisporeni players
Expatriate footballers in Moldova
Expatriate footballers in Israel
Nigerian expatriate footballers